Syed Asif Saeed Kirmani is a Pakistani politician and businessman who has been a Member of Senate of Pakistan, since July 2017.

He is a son of Pakistan Movement leader Ahmad Saeed Kirmani.

His son Aftab Kirmani studies at Aitchison College.

Political career

He worked as the Special Assistant for Political Affairs to Nawaz Sharif in 2015.

He also served as the Minister of State For Political Affairs. He was elected to the Senate of Pakistan as a candidate of Pakistan Muslim League (N) (PML-N) in July 2017, replacing Babar Awan.

He was nominated by PML-N as its candidate in 2018 Pakistani Senate election. However the Election Commission of Pakistan declared all PML-N candidates for the Senate election as independent after a ruling of the Supreme Court of Pakistan.

He was re-elected to the Senate as an independent candidate on general seat from Punjab in the Senate election He was backed in the election by PML-N and joined the treasury benches, led by PML-N after getting elected. He took oath as Senator on 12 March 2018.

References

Living people
Members of the Senate of Pakistan
Pakistan Muslim League (N) politicians
Year of birth missing (living people)